The Los Angeles Film Critics Association Award for Best Documentary Feature is one of the annual awards given by the Los Angeles Film Critics Association.

History
This award had been given since 1988. The award is also known as Best Documentary/Non-Fiction film.

Winners

1980s

1990s

2000s

2010s

2020s
2020: Time - Garrett Bradley
2021: Summer of Soul - Questlove
2022: All the Beauty and the Bloodshed - Laura Poitras

Multiple wins
Agnes Varda - 3 (one co-win)
Werner Herzog - 2
Laura Poitras - 2

See also
Academy Award for Best Documentary Feature

References

Los Angeles Film Critics Association Awards
American documentary film awards
Awards established in 1988